The 27th Lo Nuestro Awards ceremony, presented by the American network Univision, honoring the best Latin music of 2014 in the United States, took place on February 19, 2015, at the American Airlines Arena in Miami, Florida beginning at 5:00 p.m. PST (8:00 p.m. EST). During the ceremony, Lo Nuestro Awards were presented in 31 categories. The ceremony was televised in the United States by Univision.

American singer-songwriter Romeo Santos and Spanish artist Enrique Iglesias earned six awards each, including Artist of the Year for Santos and Pop Song of the Year for Iglesias; American norteño singer Gerardo Ortíz and reggaeton performer J Balvin earned three awards. Guatemalan singer-songwriter Ricardo Arjona received the Excellence Award and Italian singer Laura Pausini was recognized for her musical career.

Winners and nominees 

The nominees for the 27th Lo Nuestro Awards were announced on December 2, 2014 on the morning show ¡Despierta América! by several artist including Alejandra Guzmán, América Sierra, Chiquis, David Bisbal, Enrique Iglesias, J Balvin, Joey Montana, Laura Pausini, Leslie Grace, Luis Coronel, Noel Torres, and Wisin. Spanish singer-songwriter Enrique Iglesias with ten nominations became the most nominated act. Iglesias' record-breaking song for most weeks at number-one on the Billboard Latin Songs chart, "Bailando", is a finalist for Pop Song and Video of the Year, as well Pop Collaboration of the Year (for the featured performance by Descemer Bueno and Gente de Zona); while his songs "Loco" (with Romeo Santos) and "El Perdedor" (with Marco Antonio Solís), also received nominations. Iglesias is also shortlisted for Artist of the Year along rapper J Balvin, band Calibre 50, and bachata performer Romeo Santos.

American singer Romeo Santos and Spanish artist Enrique Iglesias were the most awarded performers, with six awards each, including a joint win for Tropical Collaboration of the Year for the track "Loco". Santos was named Artist of the Year. For the Regional Mexican Female Artist of the Year, Chiquis earned her first nomination up against her late mother, Jenni Rivera. About the nomination, Chiquis declared to the website Latin Times: "It's a great honor to be nominated for the first time for Premio Lo Nuestro, but it's a great honor that I feel to be nominated with my mom." Jenni Rivera won the award, two years after her death, and her daughter Chiquis received the accolade on her behalf. Guatemalan singer-songwriter Ricardo Arjona received the Excellence Award.

Winners are listed first and indicated with a double-dagger.

Ceremony information

Categories and voting process
The categories considered were for the Pop, Tropical, Regional Mexican, and Urban genres, with additional awards for the General Field that includes nominees from all the genres, for the Artist of the Year, New Artist and Music Video categories. The nominees were selected based on the Top 500 Latin Songs played during the eligibility period, October 1, 2013 to September 30, 2014, according to Nielsen Broadcast Data Systems. The winner for the 31 categories were selected through an online voting poll at the official website during December, 2014.

References

2015 music awards
Lo Nuestro Awards by year
2015 in Florida
2015 in Latin music
2010s in Miami